The 2012 St. Petersburg Open was a tennis tournament played on indoor hard courts. It was the 17th edition of the St. Petersburg Open, and part of the ATP World Tour 250 Series of the 2012 ATP World Tour. It took place at the Petersburg Sports and Concert Complex in Saint Petersburg, Russia, from 17 September through 23 September 2012. Third-seeded Martin Kližan won the singles title.

Singles main-draw entrants

Seeds

 1 Seeds are based on the rankings of September 10, 2012

Other entrants
The following players received wildcards into the singles main draw:
  Evgeny Donskoy
  Mikhail Elgin
  Teymuraz Gabashvili

The following players received entry from the qualifying draw:
  Sergey Betov
  Nikolai Fidirko
  Andrey Kumantsov
  Andrei Vasilevski

The following players received entry as lucky loser:
  Ivan Nedelko

Withdrawals
  Igor Andreev (right shoulder injury)
  Pablo Andújar
  Aljaž Bedene
  Blaž Kavčič
  Mikhail Kukushkin

Retirements
  Andrey Kumantsov (dizziness)
  Paolo Lorenzi (left Achilles tendon injury)
  Philipp Petzschner (knee injury)
  Jürgen Zopp (back injury)

Doubles main-draw entrants

Seeds

 Rankings are as of September 10, 2012

Other entrants
The following pairs received wildcards into the doubles main draw:
  Ričardas Berankis /  Nikita Gudozhnikov
  Andrey Yakovlev /  Alexander Zhurbin

Finals

Singles

 Martin Kližan defeated  Fabio Fognini, 6–2, 6–3
It was Kližan's first title on the ATP World Tour.

Doubles

 Rajeev Ram /  Nenad Zimonjić defeated  Lukáš Lacko /  Igor Zelenay 6–2, 4–6, [10–6]

External links
Official website

St. Petersburg Open
St. Petersburg Open
St. Petersburg Open
St. Petersburg Open